The 1995 Exxon World Sports Car Championship and Supreme GT Series seasons were the 25th season of the IMSA GT Championship.  It consisted of open-cockpit prototypes referred to as the World Sports Car (WSC) class and Grand Tourer-style racing cars divided into GTS-1 and GTS-2 classes.  It began February 4, 1995, and ended October 8, 1995, after eleven rounds.

Schedule
Most races on the schedule had all three classes running together, while shorter events saw the classes separated into separate events of varying length. Races marked with All had all classes on track at the same time for the whole race.

Season results

† - The 24 Hours of Daytona was won by Kremer Racing, but their car did not comply with WSC rules and therefore did not score points.  Brix Racing was the highest finishing WSC-class car.

External links
 World Sports Racing Prototypes - 1995 IMSA GT Championship standings

IMSA GT Championship seasons
IMSA GT